Alechia Janeice Campbell (born May 22, 1974) known professionally as Leela James, is an American R&B and soul singer-songwriter.

Music career
James made her debut on the soundtrack to the 2000 Jamie Foxx film Bait on the Roots song "Work", credited as Alechia James.

In 2004, James toured as an opening act for the Black Eyed Peas and Macy Gray. That same year, she was featured on hip hop producer, DJ, and emcee Pete Rock's album Soul Survivor II, providing vocals to the track "No Tears". In 2005, she lent her voice to the posthumously released Ray Charles album Genius & Friends, duetting with the singer on the song "Compared to What".

James' debut album, A Change Is Gonna Come, was released on June 21, 2005. The album was conceived as a throwback to an earlier era of American soul music, building upon the legacy of 1960s and 1970s soul singers while incorporating elements of contemporary R&B, funk, and gospel.

James co-wrote most of the tracks on her debut album, two exceptions being her covers of the pop rock band No Doubt's 1996 hit "Don't Speak" and the Sam Cooke song "A Change Is Gonna Come". Notable collaborators on the album include Raphael Saadiq, Kanye West and Wyclef Jean.

James guested on Robert Randolph and the Family Band's 2006 album Colorblind, lending her vocals to "Stronger".

After parting ways with Warner Bros., James signed with the independent label Shanachie Records and released her second studio album on March 24, 2009, an all-cover set entitled Let's Do It Again, in homage to the Staple Singers.

In June 2009, James appeared on the Moby album Wait for Me, performing the vocal on "Walk with Me".

James' third album My Soul, her first with the Stax label, was released on May 24, 2010, and debuted on the US Hip Hop/R&B chart at No. 7. Speaking in May 2010 to UK soul writer Pete Lewis of Blues & Soul, she stated: "With this album I wanted to make sure that I showed all sides of me – in terms of variety in the music and in my vocal range – while at the same time making it clear that every song deeply came from my soul. Plus I also wanted to incorporate a little more hip hop this time, and infuse it with my traditional R&B – because I felt that. By making my beats edgier and harder-hitting, I'd show there was more to me than just doing ballads and things of that sort."

On July 31, 2012, James released her fourth studio album , Loving You More... In the Spirit of Etta James. Originally the album was going to have one song honoring Etta James, but with her death it became a full tribute album. It was released by Shanachie Records.

On July 8, 2014, James released her fifth studio album, Fall For You. The album's first two singles, "Say That" feat. Anthony Hamilton and "Fall For You" both reached Top 15 on the Billboard Urban AC charts, with "Fall For You" reaching No. 12. James supported her album with tours nationwide, including performances at Essence Music Festival, Arizona Jazz Fest, San Diego Jazz Fest, Capitol Jazz Fest, and more.

James' sixth album, Did It for Love was released on March 31, 2017, by Shesangz Music under license to BMG. The album has the singles "Don't Want You Back" released on October 28, 2016, "Hard for Me" released on February 25, 2017, "Don't Mean a Thang" released on March 27, 2017, and a video single "All Over Again" on May 4, 2017. The single "Don't Want You Back" reached number 1 on Billboard''' Adult R&B Songs chart on April 15, 2017, becoming her highest-charting single ever.

In February 2021, James debuted the song "Complicated", the first single off her seventh studio album See Me. It peaked at No. 3 on Billboard' Adult R&B Songs chart on August 21, 2021.

Television appearances
In 2014 and 2015, she starred on seasons 2 and 3 of the TV One reality show R&B Divas: Los Angeles.

Influences
James cites singers James Brown, Roberta Flack, Toni Braxton, Marvin Gaye, Donny Hathaway, Gladys Knight, Mavis Staples, Etta James as influences.

Discography

Studio albums
 A Change Is Gonna Come (2005)
 Let's Do It Again (2009)
 My Soul (2010)
 Loving You More... In the Spirit of Etta James (2012)
 Fall for You (2014)
 Did It for Love (2017)
 See Me (2021)

EP albums
 Are You Ready?'' (2019) (with The Truth Band)

Awards and nominations

References

External links

21st-century African-American women singers
African-American women singer-songwriters
American contraltos
American rhythm and blues singer-songwriters
Living people
Musicians from Los Angeles
American neo soul singers
Warner Records artists
Singer-songwriters from California
American contemporary R&B singers
21st-century American women singers
21st-century American singers
Ballad musicians
1974 births